Zaragoza-Portillo is an underground railway station opened in 2008 in the Spanish city of Zaragoza, Aragon.

History
The station is located on the site of the former Zaragoza-Campo Sepulcro station which opened in 1863 and renamed Zaragoza-Portillo in 1973. It was the city's main railway station prior to the opening of the Zaragoza–Delicias railway station in 2003.

Services 

Zaragoza-Portillo is primarily served by the Cercanías Zaragoza commuter rail line, with a frequency of every 60 minutes. Regional services to Logroño and Canfranc via Huesca also call at Portillo.

References

Railway stations in Spain opened in 2008
Buildings and structures in Zaragoza
Railway stations located underground
Railway stations located underground in Spain